Foothills Mall is an indoor regional shopping mall located in Casas Adobes, Arizona, United States, with a Tucson postal address. Foothills Mall is a dead mall with capacity for over 90 stores and outlets for consumers and/or tourists, along with 8 restaurants and the AMC Theatres Foothills 15.

History

Opened in 1982 as a small upscale mall, Foothills Mall originally including Goldwater's (102, 939 ft.2) and Levy's (103, 429 ft.2) as its anchors, as well as the Plitt Foothills 4 Cinemas.  In 1985, Levy's became Sanger-Harris and in 1987, Foley's. In 1988, Foothills 4 Cinemas became Cineplex Odeon Foothills 7 Cinemas while Goldwater's became Dillard's in 1989.  Both Dillard's and Foley's closed in 1994, as they were overlapped at nearby Tucson Mall.

By the mid-1990s, Foothills Mall was finding little support for its upscale niche and was largely vacant.  The mall was re-tenanted as an ancillary/outlet oriented mall, with Barnes & Noble and Saks Fifth Avenue's Off Fifth outlet opening in the former Dillard's space.  Meanwhile, a Ross Dress for Less, Linens ‘N’ Things, and Nike Factory Store moved into the former Foley's, and the Cineplex Odeon Foothills 7 Cinemas was given 8 new screens.  A standalone Walmart Supercenter was also added in the mid-1990s, as well as new stores on the perimeter of the property.  The Cineplex Odeon Foothills 15 Cinemas became Loews Cineplex Foothills 15 Theatres in 1998, and AMC Loews Foothills 15 Theatres in 2005.

After nearly two decades of experiencing success with the outlet mall concept, Foothills Mall faced difficulty in 2016 retaining tenants after the opening of the Tucson Premium Outlets in nearby Marana. Within six months of the outdoor mall opening, major tenants Saks Fifth Avenue's Off Fifth outlet, Old Navy's Outlet, Hanes and Nike Factory Store closed or announced plans to close their existing Foothills Mall locations in favor of a store at Tucson Premium Outlets.

Tenants including Bath and Body Works, American Eagle Outfitters and a 15-screen AMC Loews Theaters / IMAX Theater, alongside Applebee's and Outback Steakhouse on the perimeter of the mall remain open.

References

External links
 Welcome to Foothills Mall | Tucson, AZ

Shopping malls in Arizona
Buildings and structures in Tucson, Arizona
Economy of Tucson, Arizona
Shopping malls in Pima County, Arizona
Shopping malls established in 1982
1982 establishments in Arizona
Outlet malls in the United States